Sinipercidae, the Chinese perches or Oriental perches, is a family of freshwater ray-finned fishes , part of the superfamiy Percoidea, suborder Percoidei of the order Perciformes.They have been placed within the temperate perch family, Percichthyidae in the past but may be more closely allied to the Centrarchidae.

Behaviour
Based on genetic adaption, species of Sinipercidae fish have different growth, predatory feeding habit, aggression and pyloric caeca development. These fishes mostly eat live prey fishes because they have low Ectodysplasin A Receptor(EDAR) and very few gill rakers. In some species, larvae are cannibals at first feeding which leads to death of predator and prey.

Genera
There are two extant genera and one extinct genus within the family Sinipercidae:

 Coreoperca Herzenstein, 1896
 Siniperca Gill, 1862
 †Inabaperca Yabumoto & Uyeno, 2000

References

 
Percoidea
Ray-finned fish families